No. 10 Squadron  (Daggers) was a fighter squadron equipped with MiG-27. It was based at Jodhpur Air Force Station. The squadron was number plated in March 2019.

History
No. 10 Squadron, Indian Air Force was the last squadron of the Indian Air Force to be created during the Second World War, and was formed in 1944.

The squadron was presented with its President's Standard on 18 March 1985, at Jodhpur.

Assignments
Burma campaign
Indo-Pakistani War of 1947–1948
Indo-Pakistani War of 1965
Bangladesh Liberation War of 1971

Aircraft

References 

010
Military units and formations established in 1944